Brooks Park  is a softball field in Washington, Pennsylvania, United States, used by the Washington & Jefferson Presidents softball team. It also has home and away dugouts and separate bullpens.

In 2004, the field was renovated with funding provided by the Robert and Susan Brooks and the Brooks Foundation. The entire field was re-sodded and an outfield wall was added. Off the field, a new scoreboard was installed and a public address system and press box were added.

References

College softball venues in the United States
Washington & Jefferson Presidents sports venues
Softball venues in Pennsylvania
Sports venues in Pennsylvania